Sir Danvers Osborn, 3rd Baronet (17 November 1715 – 12 October 1753), served briefly in 1753 as colonial governor of New York Province. During the Jacobite Uprising, he had raised and commanded troops in support of the king. He later served as a Member of Parliament from Bedfordshire (1747–1753). In 1750, he traveled to Nova Scotia and was part of the Nova Scotia Council. He had a history of melancholia, as it was then called, and committed suicide in New York shortly after taking office.

Early life 
Osborn was born on 17 November 1715, at Chicksands village (Shefford, Bedfordshire, England), which was the seat of the Osborn family. His father was John Osborn, eldest son of Sir John Osborn, 2nd Baronet (see Osborn baronets). Of the previous four generations of paternal relatives, two grandmothers (Lady Doroty Danvers and Lady Eleanor Danvers) had belonged to the Danvers lineage. Osborn's mother was Sarah Byng. Her father was George Byng, the 1st Viscount Torrington, whereas her brother was the Admiral John Byng. Both Byng relatives were prominent figures against the Jacobite rising of 1689. In 1720, he succeeded his grandfather in the baronetcy.

Osborn was married to Lady Mary Montagu on 25 September 1740. She was of the 8th generation of Henry VIII's lineage. Her father was George Montagu, 1st Earl of Halifax, whereas her brother George Montagu-Dunk became the 2nd Earl. Osborn begot two children, of whom one was named George. However, in 1743, Lady Montagu died after delivering the second child. Osborn was quite affected by grief for her for the rest of his life. During the subsequent years, Osborn was a frequent guest at the Montagu-Dunk's manor of Horton (Northamptonshire).

Political career 

When Charles Edward Stuart rebelled in 1745 (Jacobite rising of 1745) in behalf of the House of Stuart, Osborn raised troops to support the King George II, commanding such forces into battle, within Colonel Bedford's regiment, under the Duke of Cumberland.

Subsequently, Osborn represented Bedfordshire as a Member of Parliament (1747–1753). In 1750, following the 2nd Earl of Halifax, who was presiding the Board of Trade and founding the city of Halifax in Nova Scotia, Danvers Osborn travelled to Nova Scotia for six weeks, integrating into the Nova Scotia Council (August). Therein, many issues were attended by Osborn, such as the supplies of the new settlers, the remuneration of the construction workers of the royal projects, and the regulation of the local trade, which was functioning then on Sundays despite the biblical precepts. Attending to so many local matters brought Osborn esteem from the settlers. Back in England, in December, he discussed the issues of Halifax with the official functionaries of trade and plantation.

In May 1753, the Board of Trade recommended that Danvers Osborn should be the next Royal Governor of the Province of New York. In July, his appointment was approved. After his arrival on 6 October, Osborn was welcomed officially by the mayor and the assemblymen of New York, and formally assumed his office on 10 October. His personal secretary was the Englishman Thomas Pownall.

Death 
On 12 October 1753, Osborn's dead body was found in the garden of the house in which he was lodged, which  belonged to a local councilman. The body presented evidences of strangulation. James De Lancey, the lieutenant governor who took over as acting governor on Osborn's death, reported to the Board of Trade that Osborn had had a melancholic demeanor, which evidenced a great psychological disorder. Historically, such depression to provoke Osborn's suicide, is attributed to grief over his lost wife. The New York Post reported his death and gave details of the last week of his life before his suicide.

Initially, Osborn was buried at the Trinity Church of New York. In 1754, his remains were transported to Osborn's native parish of England (Chicksands), where he was reinterred.

See also 
Chicksands
Bedfordshire
George Montagu-Dunk, 2nd Earl of Halifax
Jacobite risings
Halifax, Nova Scotia
Province of New York
James DeLancey
Danvers, Massachusetts a town named after his honor.

Sources 
 Colonial Governors of NY
 Sir Danvers Osborn
 
 Chicksands. A Millennium Of History
 .

External links 
 The Priory of Chicksands.
Timeline of the Priory.

1715 births
1753 deaths
Baronets in the Baronetage of England
Governors of the Province of New York
Members of the Parliament of Great Britain for English constituencies
British politicians who committed suicide
People from Shefford, Bedfordshire
Suicides by hanging in England